Erik Paulson (born June 28, 1966) is an American mixed martial artist. He is the first American to win the World Light-Heavy Weight Shooto Title in Japan.

Biography
Erik started his career in martial arts starting with Judo at age of 8. However, he got disillusioned after failing to use it in self-defense, when a bully blocked his hip throw by pulling his hair and forced Erik to strike him in order to win. Convinced that striking arts were the best to defend himself, he took up Taekwondo, Boxing, Karate, Aikido,  Wrestling, and Jujutsu. Many years after, he moved to California and became a student under Dan Inosanto, Gene Lebell, and Benny Urquidez, learning styles like Kickboxing, Jeet Kune Do, Savate,  Arnis/Kali/Eskrima, Kung Fu, Sambo, Muay Thai, Chin Na, Dumog, Panantukan, and Silat.
In 1988, however, Paulson returned to explore grappling when he started Brazilian Jiu-Jitsu under Rorion, Royce and Rickson Gracie in his garage. Upon returning to Inosanto's academy, he met Yorinaga Nakamura, who taught him Shoot Wrestling. Paulson also trained extensively in Catch Wrestling under Billy Robinson. Paulson got hooked with the style, and through Nakamura he got in touch with Satoru Sayama in order to fight in Shooto. In 1993, Erik had his first fight there, submitting Kazuhiro Kusayanagi. He also asked to compete in Ultimate Fighting Championship, but the Gracies refused as Royce was already going to compete there, so Paulson ended up cornering him instead.

Later, in 1995, Paulson took part in an MMA tournament similar to UFC, World Combat Championships, which divided its participants in "strikers" and "grapplers" in order to pit them against each other in the finals. Again, a Gracie participated in the event, Renzo, but this time Paulson got the green light to take part in the tournament. Unfortunately, Paulson was put into the striker block, in which rules prohibited submission finishes, and it took away Erik's best field. Moreover, his long hair played against him, as he couldn't cut it due to his role as a film stuntman. His first match, against Muay Thai exponent Sean McCully, evidenced both disadvantages, with Paulson having to endure hair pulling and a significant punishment in order to finish him by ground and pound. At the second round, he faced Kickboxing champion James Warring, heavier and better rested, and this time Paulson's hair weakness took dramatic proportions; Warring grabbed the cage in order to avoid being taken down and literally dragged Paulson around the cage by the hair, making his corner throw the towel. After returning to the Gracie academy, Rickson expelled him without explanation and forbade him to train Brazilian Jiu-Jitsu again, but Paulson simply moved to train it with the Machado brothers.

Paulson still competed in Shooto, being sent as a representative to the Vale Tudo Japan event, where he was submitted in 0:41 by Canadian grappler Carlos Newton. He retired shortly after, focusing in teaching as opposed to fighting, though he came out of retirement in October 2007 to headline the first HDNET MMA fight card. Paulson took on Jeff Ford in the main event of the night. Paulson made quick work of Ford, winning by spinning armbar in the opening minutes of the first round.

Erik is the founder of Combat Submission Wrestling, and STX Kickboxing. He runs the CSW Training Center in Fullerton, California, where he trains MMA fighters such as Josh Barnett, Ken Shamrock, Renato Sobral, Cub Swanson, and James Wilks. He is closely affiliated with Sean Sherk and Brock Lesnar of the Minnesota Martial Arts Academy. As well, Paulson was the striking coach for Team Lesnar on The Ultimate Fighter: Season 13, and he is the coauthor of a book along with American Combat Association president Matthew Granahan and JD Dwyer on the History of American Submission Wrestling. He also has a younger brother, Leif Paulson, who is an up-and-coming grappler in his own right.

He wrestled for Inoki Genome Federation in 2008. 

Erik played Kumite fighter Stellio in Bloodsport III, where his character faced Alex Cardo played by Daniel Bernhardt. He trained Djimon Hounsou in Shoot Wrestling for his role of Mixed Martial Arts instructor Jean Roqua in the 2008 action drama Never Back Down.

Championships and accomplishments
Shooto
World Light-Heavy Weight Shooto Championship

Mixed martial arts record

|Win
|align=center|11–4–2
|Jeff Ford
|Submission (armbar)
|HDNF 1: HD Net Fights
|
|align=center|1
|align=center|1:44
|Dallas, Texas, United States
|
|-
|Win
|align=center|10–4–2
|Ronald Jhun
|Decision (unanimous)
|SB 17: SuperBrawl 17
|
|align=center|3
|align=center|5:00
|Honolulu, Hawaii, United States
|
|-
|Win
|align=center|9–4–2
|Masanori Suda
|TKO (punches)
|Shooto: Las Grandes Viajes 5
|
|align=center|3
|align=center|4:48
|Tokyo, Japan
|
|-
|Loss
|align=center|8–4–2
|Carlos Newton
|Submission (armbar)
|VTJ 1997: Vale Tudo Japan 1997 
|
|align=center|1
|align=center|0:41
|Urayasu, Japan
|
|-
|Loss
|align=center|8–3–3
|Paul Jones
|Decision (majority)
|Shooto: Reconquista 3
|
|align=center|3
|align=center|5:00
|Tokyo, Japan
|
|-
| Draw
|align=center|8–2–2
|Paul Jones
|Draw
|EF 4: Extreme Fighting 4
|
|align=center|3
|align=center|5:00
|Des Moines, Iowa, United States
|
|-
|Win
|align=center|8–2–1
|Stuart Harrison
|Submission (armbar)
|Shooto: Reconquista 1
|
|align=center|2
|align=center|2:28
|Tokyo, Japan
|
|-
|Loss
|align=center|7–2–1
|Matt Hume
|TKO (cut)
|EF 3: Extreme Fighting 3
|
|align=center|3
|align=center|0:44
|Tulsa, Oklahoma, United States
|
|-
|Win
|align=center|7–1–1
|Kenji Kawaguchi
|Submission (toe hold)
|Shooto: Vale Tudo Junction 3
|
|align=center|3
|align=center|1:23
|Tokyo, Japan
|
|-
|Win
|align=center|6–1–1
| Todd Bjornethun
|Submission (guillotine choke)
|Shooto: Vale Tudo Junction 1
|
|align=center|2
|align=center|0:26
|Tokyo, Japan
|
|-
|Loss
|align=center|5–1–1
|James Warring
|TKO (corner stoppage)
|WCC 1: First Strike
|
|align=center|1
|align=center|16:08
|Charlotte, North Carolina, United States
|
|-
|Win
|align=center|5–0–1
|Sean McCully
|TKO (submission to strikes)
|WCC 1: First Strike
|
|align=center|1
|align=center|5:17
|Charlotte, North Carolina, United States
|
|-
|Win
|align=center|4–0–1
|Yasunori Okuda
|Technical submission (keylock)
|Shooto: Vale Tudo Perception
|
|align=center|1
|align=center|0:44
|Tokyo, Japan
|
|-
|Win
|align=center|3–0–1
|Ben Spijkers
|Submission (guillotine choke)
|Shooto: Complete Vale Tudo Access
|
|align=center|5
|align=center|0:38
|Saitama, Japan
|
|-
|Win
|align=center|2–0–1
|Kenji Kawaguchi
|Technical submission (armbar)
|Shooto: Vale Tudo Access 2
|
|align=center|2
|align=center|1:03
|Tokyo, Japan
|
|-
| Draw
|align=center|1–0–1
|Naoki Sakurada
|Draw 
|Shooto: Shooto
|
|align=center|5
|align=center|3:00
|Tokyo, Japan
|
|-
|Win
|align=center|1–0
|Kazuhiro Kusayanagi 
|Submission (triangle choke)
|Shooto: Shooto
|
|align=center|3
|align=center|1:46
|Tokyo, Japan
|

Submission grappling record

|- style="text-align:center; background:#f0f0f0;"
| style="border-style:none none solid solid; "|Result
| style="border-style:none none solid solid; "|Opponent
| style="border-style:none none solid solid; "|Method
| style="border-style:none none solid solid; "|Event
| style="border-style:none none solid solid; "|Date
| style="border-style:none none solid solid; "|Round
| style="border-style:none none solid solid; "|Time
| style="border-style:none none solid solid; "|Notes
|-
|Loss|| Xande Ribeiro || Points || ADCC 2003 –99 kg|| 2003|| || ||
|-

See also 
 List of Shooto Champions

References

External links
 
 ErikPaulson.com
 
 USA Shooto

1966 births
American catch wrestlers
American male sport wrestlers
American male mixed martial artists
American practitioners of Brazilian jiu-jitsu
American Jeet Kune Do practitioners
American male taekwondo practitioners
American eskrimadors
American male kickboxers
American male karateka
American male judoka
American expatriate sportspeople in Japan
American wushu practitioners
American Muay Thai practitioners
Mixed martial artists utilizing Muay Thai
Mixed martial artists utilizing taekwondo
Mixed martial artists utilizing karate
Mixed martial artists utilizing judo
Mixed martial artists utilizing Wing Chun
Mixed martial artists utilizing Jeet Kune Do
Mixed martial artists utilizing silat
Mixed martial artists utilizing wrestling
Mixed martial artists utilizing shootfighting
Mixed martial artists utilizing Brazilian jiu-jitsu
People awarded a black belt in Brazilian jiu-jitsu
American submission wrestlers
Mixed martial arts trainers
Living people